Kenneth James Box (1 December 1930 – 1 September 2022) was a retired track and field sprinter, who represented Great Britain in the men's 100 metres and 4×100 metres relay at the 1956 Summer Olympics in Melbourne, Australia. He was born in West Derby.

He won the silver medal at the 1954 European Athletics Championships in Berne, Switzerland in the men's 4×100 metres relay, alongside George Ellis, Kenneth Jones and Brian Shenton.

He also competed at the 1954 British Empire and Commonwealth Games and was fourth in the relay, having been eliminated in the 100 yards heats.

References

1930 births
2022 deaths
People from West Derby
Sportspeople from Liverpool
English male sprinters
British male sprinters
Olympic athletes of Great Britain
Athletes (track and field) at the 1956 Summer Olympics
Commonwealth Games competitors for England
Athletes (track and field) at the 1954 British Empire and Commonwealth Games
European Athletics Championships medalists